Erwin Weber (born 12 June 1959 in Munich) is a former German rally driver. He was the winner of the European Rally Championship in 1992, finished on the podium four times in the World Rally Championship and 2nd in the 1992 Dakar Rally.

Podiums (WRC)

External links 
 Driver profile, Rallybase.nl

1959 births
Living people
German rally drivers

Volkswagen Motorsport drivers
World Rally Championship drivers